Islamic Fiqh Academy may refer to:

 International Islamic Fiqh Academy, Jeddah
 Islamic Fiqh Academy, India